Tiranë Heliport (also Tirana-Farka Heliport)  is a public use heliport located 2 nautical miles east-southeast of Tiranë, Tiranë, Albania.
The estimated terrain elevation above sea level is 207 metres.

See also
 List of airports in Albania

References

External links 
 Airport record for Tiranë Heliport at Landings.com.

Heliports in Albania
Buildings and structures in Tirana